Tseng, Sheng-guang (Amis: Singciang; ; also known as Jonathan Tseng; September 12, 1997 – November 2, 2022) was a Taiwanese army veteran who volunteered to join the International Legion of Territorial Defence of Ukraine and was the first soldier from East Asia to be killed in action during the Russo-Ukrainian War.

Early life and education 
Tseng was born in a Taiwanese indigenous family of the Sakizaya tribe in the Hualien County on the East Taiwan. His parents immigrated to Belize but got divorced, and his mother brought him back to Taiwan. When he returned to Taiwan, he learned English, Spanish, Amis and Taiwanese Mandarin, and represented his local high school to participate in an English competition and won second place.

Military career 
Tseng joined the army in 2016 after high school graduation, and served 5 years in an armoured battalion and in the 2nd Logistics Department of the Huadong Defense Command, achieving the rank of corporal, and was honorably discharged in 2021.

On June 19 2022, Tseng joined the International Legion of Territorial Defence of Ukraine to fight against the Russian invasion, and in the beginning of September, entered the Carpathian Sich Battalion, an earlier Special Tasks Patrol Police company of the Ministry of Internal Affairs that had been reformed in May as the 49th Infantry Battalion in the Armed Forces of Ukraine. The unit participated in the counteroffensive operations of the Eastern Ukraine campaign and stood on the forefront to provide flanking maneuver support in the Battle of Donbas to recover the strategical cities as Russian logistics transmission centers of Izium and Lyman, where massive graves were uncovered. The Carpathian Sich Battalion went on to secure more settlements and a series of dams in the northern Donetsk Oblast by October 3.

On October 23, Tseng's light infantry troop was assigned from Terny in the Lymansky direction of the Donetsk Oblast to Kreminna in the Luhansk Oblast, and took out three positions in the following days, then held the frontline awaiting the main force for nine days. On November 1, air-strikes hit the troopers and Tseng hard with concussion; after covering three colleagues to retreat under the Russian artillery and tank siege next day, Tseng suffered from a head injury and a broken left leg by a mortar bombardment, then died of bleeding, becoming the first East Asian soldier to be killed in action in the war, Tseng's teammate, Australian sniper Trevor Kjeldal (dubbed "Ninja"), also was killed in action by a mortar attack in the same battle. A friend of Tseng, a Japanese volunteer in the Ukrainian Foreign Legion and a colleague in the 49th Rifle Battalion, nicknamed  posted Tseng's pictures online in lament, stating: "Be my friend in next life" who was later killed in action too on November 9.

Ukrainian Parliament Foreign Affairs Committee Chairman Oleksandr Merezhko, Deputy Battalion commander Ruslan Andriyko and his American troop leader nicknamed as "Boris" paid tribute to Tseng and Taiwan. Tseng’s mother comforted: "Knowing that, in the last moments of his life, Sheng-guang was fighting alongside a group of the bravest warriors, that they supported each other and were together in life and death… I find a lot of consolation."

Personal life 
Tseng was born baptised with a Protestant Christian family and was associated with the Presbyterian Church in Taiwan during his life. He was married, and fathered one child. His widowed wife is currently working in Taoyuan.

He paid attention to the ROC military reform issues, and shares the publicized analyses of other professional commentators, including that the Han Kuang Exercises had become "acting shows", that were not practical in line with actual operations; the four-month conscription service was too short and should be upgraded to one year; and traditional Huangpu ideology, bayonet fighting technique, Vietnam War strategies, etc. were hindering Taiwanese military reforms; and considered that "the Civil defense system, the reserve mobilization system, the disaster response capability, and the strategic material reserves are immature and some even non-existent..." 

During the Chinese military exercises around Taiwan in August, Tseng considered to return from Ukraine to re-join the Taiwanese military, ultimately remaining in Ukraine. In response to Chinese nationalist netizens criticising to his Facebook account as a "damn Taiwanese independence supporter", he replied: "I am a Taiwanese, not a Chinese."

Shortly after Tseng's death news revealed, a document was posted online showing unpaid credit card debts and bills summed up to NT$ 1 million dollars (approximately $32,500 US dollars), and sparked doubt on his actual motive to go to Ukraine, but His Taiwanese church chaplain, clergies and Ukrainian officials explained that "his true intention was based on the sense of justice with no desire of heroism, but hearing the call to protect the innocent civilians from brutality and life danger, and telling Taiwan: 'the war was never too far from us', but 'let justice roll on like a river, and righteousness like a never-failing stream!'" (Amos 5:24) Ukrainian Parliamentarian Inna Sovsun saw Tseng as a Ukrainian soldier, stating that Tseng "had a sense of duty for freedom. For four years, he prepared to defend his motherland from Chinese invaders, but he went to defend a foreign country, which faced the same threat as his."

Aftermath 
On November 11, 2022, an amateur Taiwanese "Fun Chi Band" of 6 members released a MV song to commemorate Tseng's spirit fighting for the democracy and freedom in Ukraine.

In the farewell ceremony held at the Saints Peter and Paul Garrison Church in Lviv on November 15, Tseng's family received the honour of a Ukrainian National Flag with a medal, his battalion emblem and wearing Ukraine-Taiwan-united armband, along with a Russian bayonet in recognition of his sacrifice. On December 4, ROC Minister of Council of Indigenous Peoples, Icyang Parod, awarded them the top indigenous honor, First-class Professional Medal, posthumously. 

On December 21–27, Russia and China held a joint live fire exercise, dubbed "Maritime Interaction-2022", off Zhoushan and Taizhou in the East China Sea, north of Taiwan, to "further deepen" their cooperation, less than a week after Japan announced its defense budget increase in response to the increasing security threats, including their joint bombers exercises of Tu-95s and H-6Ks near its airspace in November and their 2021 circumnavigation of Japanese main islands by a joint Chinese-Russian flotilla. The flagship Varyag missile cruiser, the Marshal Shaposhnikov destroyer, 2 corvettes of the Pacific Fleet and 2 destroyers, 2 patrol ships, 1 multipurpose supply ship, 1 submarine of the People’s Liberation Army Navy participated the drills with Russian sailors speaking in Mandarin Chinese, and Russian ships fired missiles.

On December 27, President Tsai Ing-wen followed up after a national security meeting to announce the military reform in Taiwan: conscription term scaling-up to one year with salary increase; shifting the focus on the bayonet fighting techniques to the practical hand-to-hand combat skills; increasing the basic training contents including first aid and modernized weapon operations, and the strategical and structural re-design in line with Ukrainian experiences and American modules.  She quoted Winston Churchill to confront authoritarianism, and stated: "Ukraine is still struggling, and the firm will of the Ukrainian people to protect their homeland has inspired people all over the world who love democracy and freedom."

See also 

Aliaksiej Skoblia
Oleh Kutsyn

External links 
 International Legion of Defence Of Ukraine official site
  Carpathian Sich Youtube channel

Notes 

1997 births
2022 deaths
People from Hualien County
International Legion of Territorial Defense of Ukraine personnel
Ukrainian military personnel
Taiwanese indigenous peoples
Military personnel of the Republic of China
Foreign volunteers in the 2022 Russian invasion of Ukraine
Ukrainian military personnel killed in the 2022 Russian invasion of Ukraine